Alfons Spiessens (28 December 1888 in Boom, Belgium – 21 April 1956 in Uccle) was a Belgian cyclist.

Major results
1909
3rd Belgian National Road Race Championships
1912
10th Tour de France
1913
6th Tour de France
1914
7th Tour de France
1919
1st Drie Zustersteden
1920
1st Six Days of Brussels (with Marcel Buysse)

References

1888 births
1956 deaths
Belgian male cyclists
Cyclists from Antwerp Province
People from Boom, Belgium